Zerograd, sometimes called Zero City or Zero Town, is a 1989 Russian mystery film directed by Karen Shakhnazarov. Moscow engineer Alexey Varakin visits a small town on a business trip, where his adventures begin. He meets a naked secretary at a local factory, a prosecutor who wants to commit a crime and other strange characters. The film was selected as the Soviet entry for the Best Foreign Language Film at the 62nd Academy Awards, but was not accepted as a nominee.

Cast
 Leonid Filatov as Alexey Varakin
 Oleg Basilashvili as writer Vasily Chugunov
 Vladimir Menshov as prosecutor Nikolay Smorodinov
 Armen Dzhigarkhanyan as factory director Pavel Palych
 Yevgeniy Yevstigneyev as keeper of local museum
 Aleksei Zharkov as police detective
 Pyotr Scherbakov as head of city party council
 Elena Arzhanik as secretary
 Tatiana Khvostikova as Anna
 Yury Sherstnev as waiter Kurdyumov
 Michael Solodovnik as Attila
 Alexander Bespaly as hospitable host
 Eugene Zernov as cook

Awards
 Gold Hugo at 25th Chicago Film Festival  for best international feature film in 1989
 Silver prize at Valladolid International Film Festival in 1988
 Karen Shakhnazarov  won award by European Science Fiction Society as best author and screenwriter in Soviet Union at Eurocon, 1989 in San Marino .

See also
 List of submissions to the 62nd Academy Awards for Best Foreign Language Film
 List of Soviet submissions for the Academy Award for Best Foreign Language Film

References

External links
 
 

1989 films
1989 comedy films
1980s satirical films
Soviet comedy films
1980s Russian-language films
Films directed by Karen Shakhnazarov
Films scored by Eduard Artemyev
Russian comedy films